The Pansio-class minelayers are a three-strong class of mine warfare vessels used by the Finnish Navy, built between 1991 and 1992. The vessels can also be used for transport or to supply the naval forts. The vessels can carry a 100-ton load.

The ships are referred to as "mine ferries" in the Finnish Navy.

Mid-life upgrade

The three vessels went through a mid-life upgrade between 2015 and 2017, and are now expected to serve until the 2030s. The upgrades included new main and auxiliary engines, as well as a new high-pressure fire extinguishing system. The vessels were also equipped with a Saab Trackfire remote weapon station with a 7.62 mm PKM machine gun and a 40 mm Heckler & Koch GMG. The two Sako twin-barreled 23 mm/87 (modified ZU-23-2) were removed.

Service
On 24 August 2022 Pyhäranta ran aground in the Archipelago Sea, off Turku, Finland. Her hull was holed.

List of ships

References

Mine warfare vessel classes
Minelayers of the Finnish Navy
Minelayers of Finland
Ships built in Finland